Mary Lamar Rickey (born October 27, 1938), better known as Lara Parker, is an American television, stage, and film actress known for her role as Angelique on the ABC-TV serial Dark Shadows which aired from 1966 to 1971.

Early life
Parker was born in Knoxville, Tennessee on October 27, 1938, and grew up in Memphis. Descendant of a prominent Southern family, she is a great-great-granddaughter of Lucius Quintus Cincinnatus Lamar II and a third-great-granddaughter of Augustus Baldwin Longstreet, an uncle of Confederate General James Longstreet. She began a philosophy B.A. at Vassar College before receiving her Bachelor of Arts degree from Rhodes College (then known as Southwestern) and a Master of Arts degree in speech and drama from the University of Iowa.

Career
Parker played the role of "Laura Banner" in the opening sequence of the pilot for the television series The Incredible Hulk (1977), and the fashion model-witch "Madelaine" in the Kolchak: The Night Stalker episode "The Trevi Collection". Her other television work includes appearances on Emergency "One of Those Days"(1975-S5Ep8), Kung Fu, The Six Million Dollar Man (1976-S3Ep17: "The Secret of Bigfoot Part 1"), Police Woman, Kojak, Alice, Quincy, M.E., Hawaii Five-O, The Rockford Files, Highway to Heaven, Switch, Baretta, Galactica 1980 ("The Night The Cylons Landed", Parts I & II), Barnaby Jones (1980-The Price of Anger), the CBS daytime serial Capitol, and the ABC daytime serial One Life to Live. She played secretary Wanda in the 1977 television miniseries Washington: Behind Closed Doors and had a recurring role in the short-lived television series Jessica Novak.

Parker reprised the role of Angelique in Night of Dark Shadows, the second feature film based on Dark Shadows. She was joined by her Dark Shadows castmates Kate Jackson, David Selby, Grayson Hall, Nancy Barrett, John Karlen, and Thayer David. This film was more loosely based on the series than House of Dark Shadows was, and it did not fare as well at the box office as the first film. She appeared opposite Robert De Niro in the 1970 Brian De Palma film Hi, Mom!, but her best known film role came in the Oscar-winning drama Save the Tiger (1973), starring Jack Lemmon, in which she played a sympathetic prostitute who is devastated when her client suffers a near fatal heart attack. In 1975, she played the wife of Peter Fonda's character in Race with the Devil.

Later work
Parker made her Broadway debut in 1968 in Woman is My Idea, written and directed by Don C. Liljenquist. In 1969, she played the title role in an Off-Broadway production of Frank Wedekind's Lulu. She also appeared in the off-Broadway production of A Gun Play.

In 1998, Parker published a novel, Angelique's Descent. Its sequel, Dark Shadows: The Salem Branch, came out in July 2006, and Dark Shadows: Wolf Moon Rising was released in August 2013.  She has recently reprised the role of Angelique for a new series of Dark Shadows audio dramas, and is the reader for the audiobook recording of Angelique's Descent. In 2012, she had a cameo role in Tim Burton's movie version of Dark Shadows. Later she was reunited with her Dark Shadows co-stars Jerry Lacy and Kathryn Leigh Scott in two feature films about Doctor Mabuse written and directed by Ansel Faraj. The 1st film Doctor Mabuse was released in 2013, followed by a 2014 sequel called Doctor Mabuse: Etiopomar".
Education and Post Acting Career
Lara attended Central High School in Memphis and won a scholarship to Vassar College. At Vassar, she began a major in philosophy, which she completed at Southwestern at Memphis (now Rhodes College), receiving her BA. She attended graduate school at the University of Iowa and completed all course work on a Masters in speech and drama. She was working on her thesis while beginning her acting career. After retiring from acting, Lara became a high school and English teacher and obtained her MFA in creative writing from Antioch University.

BibliographyAngelique's DescentThe Salem BranchWolf Moon RisingReturn to Collinwood (Introduction only)Dreams of the Dark (Introduction only)Heiress of Collinwood''

Personal life
Parker is married to Jim Hawkins, a building contractor. They have a daughter, Caitlin. Parker has two sons, Rick and Andy, both from her first marriage to artist Tom Parker: Rick is a successful record producer, Andy a contractor. Caitlin Hawkins is a set designer and stylist for videos and commercials.
Lara's son Rick is married to singer Miranda Lee Richards. They have one son, Wesley.

References

External links
Original Dark Shadows Audio Dramas starring Lara Parker

1938 births
Living people
20th-century American actresses
21st-century American women
People from Knoxville, Tennessee
Actresses from Tennessee
University of Iowa alumni
Rhodes College alumni
American stage actresses
American film actresses
American television actresses
Vassar College alumni